Halo Top Creamery is an ice cream company and brand sold in the United States, Australia, Mexico, Canada, Ireland, New Zealand, the Netherlands, Germany, Denmark, Taiwan, South Korea, Austria, United Kingdom and the United Arab Emirates. The brand is marketed as a lower-calorie alternative, partially substituting sugar with stevia, a plant-based sweetener, and erythritol, a sugar alcohol.

History 
The ice cream brand was founded around 2011 by former attorney Justin Woolverton of Latham & Watkins LLP. Woolverton had begun making ice cream in his own kitchen with the goal of reducing his consumption of carbohydrates and refined sugars. In the early stages of Halo Top, Woolverton continuously experimented, tweaking and improving the ingredients for over a year. In order to create a long-lasting formula that could sustain shipment through the supply chain, Woolverton went to California Polytechnic State University, San Luis Obispo Dairy Innovation Institute, where he was able to refine and polish the formula with a contract manufacture. The company describes its product as the first ever "lifestyle" ice cream that can be eaten daily without overwhelming a typical caloric intake diet, but nutritionists have expressed that "'just because it's a slightly better choice does not mean that it is a good choice.'"

Halo Top launched in Los Angeles on June 15, 2012, and annual sales grew up around 2,500% during 2016 and continued to increase in 2017, despite a retail price of $5 per pint. In July 2017, Halo Top became the best-selling ice cream pint at grocery stores in the United States, surpassing in popularity the Ben & Jerry's and Häagen-Dazs brands, which previously held that distinction for years. By September of 2017, it had grown to 50 employees and was sold throughout the United States, Australia, New Zealand, Mexico, Canada, Ireland, Germany, Finland, the Netherlands, and the United Kingdom. By 2017, it had grown to 50 employees. 

Also in 2017, Halo Top won several international prizes, including an Institute of Taste Test Award, a Lausanne Index Clean Food Prize, and it was named "Food Disruptor of the Year" by Food Dive and one of The 25 Best Inventions of 2017 by Time Magazine.

However, 2017 proved to be the peak of Halo Top's sales, whose dollar value declined for each of the ensuing four years. The decline was attributed in substantial part to competition from major brands as well as private label products which made similar lower-Calorie, lower-sugar products. Additionally, during the first year of the COVID-19 pandemic, consumers began to shift away from lower-calorie ice cream. Halo Top sales fell the most rapidly of all ice cream brands, even as ice cream sales as a category rose, led by high-fat "premium" brands such as Magnum and Häagen-Dazs.
 
The company is currently run by Woolverton and Doug Bouton, President and COO. Woolverton met Bouton, another former attorney, in an amateur basketball league. On September 9, 2019 Halo Top announced sale of its US operations to Wells Enterprises for an undisclosed amount. It has spent the ensuing years reformulating the low-calorie line, beginning with replacing spray-dried ultrafiltered milk proteins with liquid ultrafiltered milk, which is more expensive but which reduced what many consumers found to be the product's excessive density, improved the texture, and allowed it to mix more smoothly with the other ingredients, leading to a mouthfeel that is even closer to regular full-fat, full-sugar ice cream.

Ingredients 
Halo Top's ingredients are relatively low in calories and sugar and high in protein and fiber. Halo Top is a mixture of eggs, milk, and cream, like other ice cream brands, but is distinct due to its substitution for sugar. Halo Top uses organic stevia, a plant-based sweetener, and erythritol, a sugar alcohol, to substitute sugar in their ice cream. Each pint ranges from 240–360 calories.

The ingredients used to make Halo Top ice cream include:

 Skim milk, eggs, erythritol, prebiotic fiber, milk protein concentrate, cream, organic cane sugar, vegetable glycerin, natural flavors, sea salt, organic stevia leaf, organic carob gum, organic guar gum

The nutritional value of a pint of vanilla Halo Top ice cream is:' 240 calories
 8 grams of fat
 24 grams of protein
 20 grams of fiber

Halo Top offers an array of flavors, including dairy free and vegan flavors. Consumers can also suggest new flavors online for the Halo Top team to consider bringing to market.

In Canada, although the ingredients lists are very similar to those in the U.S., all varieties of Halo Top are labelled as frozen desserts, not as ice cream, due to differences in labelling requirements.

 Variations 
Halo Top ice cream is available in dairy pints, dairy free pints, keto pints, pops, and mini pops. The original pops were first introduced in February 2019 and included the following flavors: Mint Chip, Peanut Butter Swirl, Chocolate Chip Cookie Dough, and Strawberry Cheesecake. Each pop contains only 50–60 calories. In May 2020, Halo Top released a larger version of the pops that contain 90–110 calories each. The original pops are now called Mini Pops and the larger versions are Pops. The larger Pops are available in the following flavors: Brownie Batter, Dark Chocolate Caramel, Mint Chip, Sea Salt Caramel, and Strawberry Swirl.

 Locations 
In 2018, Halo Top opened three "Scoop Shop" locations in Los Angeles, CA in Westfield Topanga, Canoga Park; at The Grove; and in Century City. These Scoop Shop locations offer soft serve, scoops, sundaes, and sandwiches with various toppings to choose from. The company closed all three on October 28, 2019.

 See also 

 List of ice cream brands

 References 

Further reading
 Boscamp, Emi (December 2, 2016). "Can a low-cal ice cream taste as good as the real deal? We put it to the test". Today''.
 
 
 
 
 Carlson, Jen (January 25, 2017). "Have You Tried This Protein-Packed, Healthy Halo Top Ice Cream Yet?" Gothamist.
 
 

Ice cream brands
Ice cream parlors
Food manufacturers of the United States
Food and drink companies based in Los Angeles
Manufacturing companies based in Los Angeles